Bulumgavhan is a village in Core forest area in Dharni Taluka, Melghat Area of Amravati District in Maharashtra state. 

Electrity became available on 14 April 2018. As the then Chief Minister Devendra Fadnavis appointed the rural development fellow under the Maharashtra Village Social Transformation Foundation. One of the CM fellow Anand Arun Joshi worked on it with the help of local government.

Population 
The village has 92 families and a population of 589. Most of the Korku families live here.

Educational facilities 
Primary schooling up to 8th standard is in the village. There is also an Anganwadi.

Transportation 

Nearest airport -Dr. Babasaheb Ambedkar International Airport

Nearest railway station - Badnera Junction railway station

MSRTC bus by Amravati, Paratwada up to Dharani, then transfer to a personal vehicle or six-seater auto or good transport private vehicle.

References 

Villages in Amravati district